John Fordyce may refer to:

 John Fordyce (priest) (died 1751), Church of England priest
 John Fordyce (politician) (1735–1809), British Member of Parliament
 John Fordyce (missionary) (1819–1902), Christian missionary and evangelical minister
 John Addison Fordyce (1858–1925), American dermatologist